Dolichopoda is a genus of cave crickets in the tribe Dolichopodaini, subfamily Dolichopodainae. They are distributed in the Mediterranean basin in southern Europe and western Asia.

The type species of the genus is Gryllus palpata, now known as Dolichopoda palpata.

Species
There are over 50 described species. The greatest species diversity occurs in Greece. Four subgenera have been named, though some have been shown to be paraphyletic (Dolichopoda) or polyphyletic (Chopardina).

Dolichopoda (Capraiacris) Baccetti, 1977
These two species lack spines on both the anterior tibiae and the hind femur.
Dolichopoda aegilion Baccetti, 1977
Dolichopoda baccettii Capra, 1957

Dolichopoda (Chopardina) Uvarov, 1921
Found in Italy, Corsica, and Greece. Distinguished from other subgenera by having several spines on the hind femurs.

Dolichopoda bormansi Brunner von Wattenwyl, 1882
Dolichopoda cyrnensis Chopard, 1950
Dolichopoda lustriae Rampini & Di Russo, 2008
Dolichopoda muceddai Rampini & Di Russo, 2005
Dolichopoda remyi Chopard, 1934
Dolichopoda schiavazzii Capra, 1934

Dolichopoda (Dolichopoda) Bolívar, 1880
The largest subgenus by number of species; distinguished from the other subgenera by the spines on the anterior tibiae.

Dolichopoda (Petrochilosina) Boudou-Saltet, 1980
Dolichopoda cassagnaui Boudou-Saltet, 1971
Dolichopoda insignis Chopard, 1955
Dolichopoda makrykapa Boudou-Saltet, 1980
Dolichopoda ochtoniai Rampini & Di Russo, 2015
Dolichopoda petrochilosi Chopard, 1954
Dolichopoda saraolacosi Rampini & Di Russo, 2015
Dolichopoda vandeli Boudou-Saltet, 1970

References

Rhaphidophoridae
Ensifera genera
Orthoptera of Europe